Andrei Snitko (born ) is a Belarusian male  track cyclist. He competed in the team pursuit event at the 2013 UCI Track Cycling World Championships.

References

External links
 Profile at cyclingarchives.com

1991 births
Living people
Belarusian track cyclists
Belarusian male cyclists
Place of birth missing (living people)